The Newark–Elizabeth Rail Link (NERL) is a New Jersey Transit proposed -long light rail line in New Jersey, which would connect the downtown areas of Newark and Elizabeth with Newark Liberty International Airport. The construction of the project was being planned in stages, or "minimum operable segments" (MOS).

The first minimum operable segment (MOS-1) opened to the public on July 17, 2006, as the Newark Light Rail Broad Street Line, connecting Broad Street Station and Penn Station in Newark.

The second segment (MOS-2) would have connected Penn Station with the airport, while the third segment became known as the Union County Light Rail.

New Jersey Transit cited the project in its 2016  Capital Improvement Program without any specific allocation.

Station listing

MOS-2 
Newark Penn Station
Market Street (at Mulberry Street)
Government Center (Mulberry Street)
Lincoln Park/Symphony Hall (Camp Street)
Newark Liberty International Airport (connecting with the airport via AirTrain Newark)

Liberty Corridor Bus Rapid Transit Service
The planned Liberty Corridor Bus Rapid Transit Service which include the Greater Newark go bus and the Union go bus expressway, will provide service along much of the route of the NERL.

References

Light rail in New Jersey
Transportation in Elizabeth, New Jersey
Rail transportation in New Jersey
Transportation in Newark, New Jersey
Proposed railway lines in New Jersey